Josh Kassel (born September 3, 1985) is a former American college ice hockey goaltender for the Army Black Knights of the Atlantic Hockey League.  He previously played for the Bozeman Icedogs from 2003 to 2005. In 2008, as a junior, Kassel was the Atlantic Hockey All-Conference Player of the Year and was in the top eight nationally for best save percentage and goals against average (GAA). He was the first goaltender to be awarded the Atlantic Hockey Player of the Year and held the best GAA in Atlantic Hockey league history.  He was selected as
Division I Men's Hockey 2008 Second Team All-Americans for the East, becoming the Army's first hockey All-American in nearly 30 years.

Kassel played significantly more poorly in his senior year, and was replaced as the starter by sophomore Jay Clark.  He retired from competitive hockey after the 2009 season.

Awards and honours

References

External links

1985 births
American men's ice hockey goaltenders
Army Black Knights men's ice hockey players
Living people
People from Greensburg, Pennsylvania
AHCA Division I men's ice hockey All-Americans
Military personnel from Pennsylvania